The West Coast Senior Lacrosse Association is a Senior B Canadian box lacrosse league. The teams are located in southwest British Columbia. Champions of the league move on to compete for the Presidents Cup, the Canadian National Senior B championship.

History
Founded in 1968 as the Inter-City Lacrosse League. In 1972 Harry George Woolley took over as commissioner, helping the Senior B league take giant strides toward respectability after years of having a reputation for being a men's recreational league. Woolley took drastic measures in changing the structure of the organization by implementing a league agreement, producing league perpetual trophies and crafting a new overall image. Attendance grew from only a half dozen people to several hundred fans during the playoffs. Out of the changes came the newly formed West Coast Senior Lacrosse Association (WCSLA) in 1973.

Teams

** inactive for 2022 season

Past teams 
Abbotsford Extra Old Stockers (1980-81), formerly Abbotsford Braves (1978-79)
Abbotsford Totems (1974), formerly Abbotsford MSA (1972-73)
Burnaby Burrards (2008-10), formerly Vancouver Burrards (1992, 1999-2007), Vancouver Vipers (1994-98), Vancouver-Killarney Vipers (1993), Vancouver Sr. B (1989-91)
Burnaby Kirby's Klippers (1976-81), formerly Burnaby Firefighters (1975), Burnaby Columbians (1973-74), Burnaby Kokanees (1971-72), Burnaby Lougheeds (1969-70), Burnaby Villa Motor Inn (1968)
Chilliwack Mustangs (2009-11)
East Vancouver Bluebirds (1984-86), formerly Vancouver Disco Sports Blue Angels (1978-83)
Nanaimo Labatts (1972-74)
New Westminster Whalers (1979-80), formerly New Westminster Mr. Sport Hotel (1975-78), New Westminster Rebels (1974), New Westminster Blues (1970-73), New Westminster Labatt Blues (1969), Coquitlam Molsons (1968)
Port Coquitlam A's (1971)
Port Coquitlam Saints (1st Ed. 1990-2001), formerly Port Coquitlam Eagles (1988-89), Port Coquitlam Kirby's Klippers (1986-87), Port Coquitlam Whalers (1983-85)
Port Moody Thunder (2012-15)
Surrey Turf Hotel Ryders (1969), formerly Surrey Dells (1968)
Valley Rebels (2005-19), formerly Surrey Rebels (1983-2004)
Vancouver Totems (1973), formerly Vancouver Killarney Sr. B (1969-72)
White Rock Hawks (1979), formerly White Rock Titans (1978)

Champions

References

External links

2
Sports leagues established in 1973
1973 establishments in British Columbia